P126 may refer to:

 BRM P126, a Formula One racing car
 Papyrus 126, a biblical manuscript
 , a patrol boat of the Turkish Navy
 P126, a state regional road in Latvia